Magalhães de Almeida is a municipality in the state of Maranhão in the Northeast region of Brazil.

History
Magalhães de Almeida, a former district of the municipality of São Bernardo since 1937, was elevated to the municipality category on October 1, 1952.

See also
List of municipalities in Maranhão

References

Municipalities in Maranhão